Huanggang Normal University (HNU) is a full-time provincial public normal university in Huangzhou District, Huanggang, Hubei, China. It is under the Educational Administration of Hubei Province. HNU offers courses to undergraduate students as well as other training courses for continuing education.

History
The predecessor of HNU was Huangzhou Normal School founded in 1905, and was renamed Huanggang County Teachers school of Hubei Province (1937), and Huanggang Teachers school of Hubei Province (1950). HNU was approved by the State Council under the name of Huanggang Normal College in 1978 and it was among the first National Colleges for advanced training in 1988. It was entitled the current name as Huanggang Normal University by the Ministry of Education in 1999.

Location
HNU is located in Huangzhou, Huanggang, Hubei, which is the hometown of the printing inventor, Bi Sheng, and Li Shizhen, a famous pharmacist in traditional Chinese medicine, and Li SiGuang (J.S.Lee), a Geologist with great achievement, and General Lin Biao, former Vice Chairman of the Communist Party of China, and Li Xiannian and Dong Biwu, former Chinese presidents.

Campus
HNU has three campuses—Zhuming, Yinpan and South Lake. The number of registered  full-time students is about 12000 and that of students in continuing education is about 1500. There are 585 faculty including 42 professors, 123 associate professors, 115 of them with PhD or master's degrees and 11 foreign experts . HNU is equipped with state-of-the-art teaching labs for experiments in biology, chemistry, physics, etc., and visual-audio labs and multi–media classrooms for various needs. Its library has a collection of 741,700 books, 1,605 periodicals in Chinese and foreign languages and nearly 11,000 periodicals of electronic editions.

Academics

HNU has now 21 schools and departments. They are Literature School, Foreign Language School, School of Art, Departments of Political Science and law, English education for undergraduates, Trade and economy, Mathematics, physics and electric technology, Chemistry, Biology, physical education, educational technology, Chinese Language and Literature, News and Media, English, Japanese, Music, Ideological and Political Education, Political and Executive Science, Science of Law, International Economy and Trade, Mathematics and Applied Mathematics, Information and Computational Science, Electronic Information Science and Technology, Electronic Information Engineering, Pharmaceutical Engineering, Biological Science, Food Science and Engineering, Physical Education  Pedagogical Technology, Computer Science and Technology. The arts and musicology are the experimental specialities of ministry of Education, the Chinese language and literature is the famous speciality in colleges and universities of Hubei province. The study of Chinese ancient literature is one of the key studies in Hubei Province. There are a group of advanced teaching and research sections and excellent courses of provincial level.

HNU is not a research university, but it integrates teaching and academic research and it has set up ten funds to finance it—the fund for modernized teaching reform, the writing of teaching material, for achievements in teaching research,  for achievements in academic research, for nurturing talents of the New Century, for international communications, for rewarding outstanding students, for instructions of professors or experts, for winning honor for our university and the fund for students’ activities. From 2001 to 2003, HNU had been undertaking 182 research projects including five provincial ones and 91 ones of Bureau lever, winning 17 awards for research achievements in the province. In addition, 76 academic monographs and text books and 2480 academic treatises have been published, of which 24 were indexed by the major international indexing systems of Science Citation Index (SCI) and Engineering Index (EI), 432 articles of drawing or creative works also has been published. The research of Chinese ancient literature, the research of revolution history of the east of Hubei province and the research of English long-distance education are influential amongst the equivalent colleges and universities nationwide.

International Communication
HNU actively carries out a wide range of international educational and cultural exchanges. It has established intercommunion and cooperation with some universities, colleges and educational or research institutes in America, Britain, Australia, France and Japan. More than 80 foreign experts and teachers have been invited to teach or give lectures at HNU and over 10 foreign teachers works at teaching post all the year round. Many faculty members have been sent abroad for training, visit or doing research in the USA, Britain, France, Australia, New Zealand, Canada, Germany, Japan, Norway, Hong Kong, Macao and so on. Moreover, there has been substantial progress in the following aspects: running university jointly with overseas universities and sent out scholars and students mutually.

Achievements
HNU lays stress on innovation education and quality education endeavoring to educate comprehensive students to meet the need of society. HNU has gained fundamental achievement in variety of national competitions, such as the National Undergraduate Competition of Mathematical modeling, Electronic designing, English Teaching, the Speech Contest, the Singing Contest, the Sports Meeting and the like. The achievements of students in scientific research and creative works are abundant, there have been published more than 2000 pieces of writings or works. The graduates of HNU received warm welcome by the employment units for solid knowledge, outstanding specialty, pragmatic spirit and innovative ability. Among the graduates of all previous years some became deputies to the National People’s Congress, committee members to Political Consultative Conference, National Model Workers, National Excellent Teachers, famous scholars, celebrated experts or successful enterprisers, some were admitted as postgraduates or even doctors and the majority of them became the backbones of fundamental teaching in the countryside. Famous as the cradle of qualified teachers, HNU has been contributing to the basic education of the Huanggang City as well as whole China. For instance, 70% head masters of middle schools of the city, including tree presidents of the famous Huanggang Middle School, are graduates of HNU. For 7 years, students won the first prize in country-wide Annual Mathematical Model Competition for university students since 1999. Its employment rate for graduates has been as high as 90%, and topped the provincial universities in 2003. Its high teaching and management quality was again proved by the fact that among the first batch of schools.

Developments
Reviewing the developing progress of HNU, the basic experience can be summarized as follows: Firstly, keeping the normal education as the mission, actively educating teaching staffs with solid knowledge, general quality and innovation spirit for fundamental education ; Secondly, adapting to the new circumstance under the innovation of higher education, Seeking the opportunities of development, persist enterprising and exploring, developing both internal and external area, coping with the relationship of innovation, development and stability; Thirdly, insisting on being practical and critical, putting everything on the basis of reality, trying to achieve sustained and healthy development of all the aspects; Fourthly, maintaining teaching as the main body, making sure the lity of educating . In addition, HNU insists on developing through innovating, strengthens party-organizing and ideological and political affairs, conducts adjustment of organizational structure, reformation of arrangements of personnel and distribution, improvement of management of teaching and scientific research, innovation of the socialization of rear service and gives impetus to the development of all the causes. Over the recent five year, HNU has been awarded a variety of honorable titles.

Since 1998, the leaders of the party and nation, for instance, Song Jian, Zhang Siqing, Chen Zhili and Minister of Education-Zhou Ji inspected HNU successively, gave important instruction in the constructions and development of our university, fully affirmed our various tasks. The leaders of Hubei Proviue and Huanggang city ca-me personally for many times to give directions in fundamental building, teaching affairs, talent-educating and so on.

Present
At present, the teaching staff and students are under the guidance of the “Three representatives” making use of the appraisal of the qualified undergraduate teaching work by the state Ministry of Education, insisting on improving the reformation, the construction and management by means of appraisal, continuing deepening the education innovation and quickening construction and development of our college, doing all we can to make greater progress in undergraduate teaching work.

References

External links

Universities and colleges in Hubei
Buildings and structures in Huanggang
Teachers colleges in China
Educational institutions established in 1905
1905 establishments in China